Giant Steps is a 1960 album by jazz musician John Coltrane.

Giant Steps may also refer to:

Music
 Giant Steps (band), dance pop duo from England that consisted of vocalist Colin Campsie and bassist/keyboardist George McFarlane
 Giant Steps (The Boo Radleys album), 1993
 Giant Steps (Tommy Flanagan album)
 Giant Steps, a compilation album by Gentle Giant
 "Giant Steps" (composition), the first track on the album of the same name by John Coltrane

Other
 Giant Steps (book), autobiography of Kareem Abdul-Jabbar, which he co-authored with Peter Knobler

See also
 Mother May I?, a children's game